Jair Eduardo Britto da Silva (born 10 June 1988), simply known as Jair, is a Brazilian football player.

Jair played for Brasil de Pelotas between 2009 and 2011. In January 2009, he was a survivor of a bus crash that killed two of his team mates and a member of the Brasil de Pelotas coaching staff.

He awarded to 2008 Brasileiro Alagoas Championship Rookie of the Year, 2009 Brasileiro Quala Championship MVP, 2010 Brasileiro Serie B MVP. In 2011, he moved to South Korean team Jeju United.

In 2013, he moved to Japanese team JEF United Chiba. He came to substitute striker Yoshihito Fujita, who left the team for Yokohama F. Marinos in J1 League.

In July 2013, he moved to Emirates Club who play in UAE Arabian Gulf League on a loan deal.

Ahead of the 2018–19 A-League season, Jair signed with Newcastle Jets with the club announcing a one-year contract in September 2018.

On 18 November 2019 it was announced he had signed a one-year contract with A-League club Central Coast Mariners. Jair was released by the Mariners at the end of the 2019–20 A-League in September 2020.

References

External links

 

 

1988 births
Living people
Brazilian footballers
Brazilian expatriate footballers
ABC Futebol Clube players
Grêmio Esportivo Brasil players
Associação Atlética Ponte Preta players
A-League Men players
K League 1 players
J1 League players
J2 League players
China League One players
JEF United Chiba players
Kashima Antlers players
Emirates Club players
Hatta Club players
Jeju United FC players
Jeonnam Dragons players
Yanbian Funde F.C. players
Newcastle Jets FC players
Central Coast Mariners FC players
Expatriate footballers in China
Brazilian expatriate sportspeople in China
Expatriate footballers in South Korea
Brazilian expatriate sportspeople in South Korea
Expatriate footballers in Japan
Brazilian expatriate sportspeople in Japan
Expatriate footballers in the United Arab Emirates
Brazilian expatriate sportspeople in the United Arab Emirates
UAE First Division League players
Association football forwards